Empathy-altruism is a form of altruism based on moral emotions or feelings for others.

Social exchange theory holds that in seemingly altruistic behavior benefits to the altruist outweigh the costs the altruist bears and thus such behavior is self-interested. In contrast, C. Daniel Batson holds that people help others in need out of genuine concern for the well-being of the other person. The key ingredient to such helping is "empathic concern". According to Batson's "empathy-altruism hypothesis", if someone feels empathy towards another person, they will help them, regardless of what they can gain from it. An alternative hypothesis is "empathy-joy", which states a person helps because they find pleasure at seeing another person experience relief (2008). When a person does not feel empathy, the standards of social exchange theory apply.

Evidence
Debate over whether other-helping behavior is motivated by self- or other-interest has raged over the last 20 years. The prime actors in this debate are Daniel Batson, arguing for empathy-altruism, and Robert Cialdini, arguing for self-interest.

Batson recognizes that people sometimes help for selfish reasons. He and his team were interested in finding ways to distinguish between motives. In one experiment, students were asked to listen to tapes from a radio program. One of the interviews was with a woman named Carol, who talked about her bad car accident in which both of her legs were broken, her struggles and how behind she was becoming in class. Students who were listening to this particular interview were given a letter asking the student to share lecture notes and meet with her. The experimenters changed the level of empathy by telling one group to try to focus on how she was feeling (high empathy level) and the other group not to be concerned with that (low empathy level). The experimenters also varied the cost of not helping: the high cost group was told that Carol would be in their psychology class after returning to school and the low cost group believed she would finish the class at home. The results confirmed the empathy-altruism hypothesis: those in the high empathy group were almost equally likely to help her in either circumstance, while the low empathy group helped out of self-interest (seeing her in class every day made them feel guilty if they did not help).

Countering hypotheses
Batson and colleagues set out to show that empathy motivates other-regarding helping behavior not out of self-interest but out of true interest in the well-being of others.
They addressed two hypotheses that counter the empathy-altruism hypothesis:
 Empathy Specific Reward: Empathy triggers the need for social reward which can be gained by helping.
 Empathy Specific Punishment: Empathy triggers the fear of social punishment which can be avoided by helping.

See also

 Affective neuroscience
 C. Sue Carter
 Edward O. Wilson
 Frans de Waal
 Helping behavior
 Jean Decety
 Moral emotions
 Social neuroscience
 Stephen Porges
 Sympathy
 W. D. Hamilton

References

Further reading
 Batson, C. D., & Leonard, B. (1987). "Prosocial Motivation: Is it ever Truly Altruistic?" Advances in Experimental Social Psychology (Vol. 20, pp. 65–122): Academic Press.
 Decety, J. & Batson, C.D. (2007). "Social neuroscience approaches to interpersonal sensitivity." Social Neuroscience, 2(3-4), 151–157.
 Decety, J. & Ickes, W. (Eds.). (2009). The Social Neuroscience of Empathy. Cambridge: MIT Press, Cambridge.
 Thompson, E. (2001). "Empathy and consciousness." Journal of Consciousness Studies, 8, 1–32.
 Zahn-Waxler, C., & Radke-Yarrow, M. (1990). "The origins of empathic concern." Motivation and Emotion, 14, 107–125.

Interpersonal relationships
Altruism
Moral psychology
Empathy